Pire may refer to:

 3228 Pire, a minor planet
 Pire, Žepče, a village in Bosnia-Herzegovina
 Pire Parish, Uganda, a parish in Kaabong District, see :Template:Kaabong District

People
 Christian Pire (1930–2000), French Olympic diver
 Dominique Pire (1910–1969), Belgian Dominican friar, recipient of the 1958 Nobel Peace Prize
 Hippolyte Piré (1778–1850), French general
 Jules Pire (1878–1953), Belgian soldier and resistance leader of World War II
 Louis Alexandre Henri Joseph Piré (1827–1887), Belgian botanist